Lavangi is a 1946 Indian Tamil-language film directed and produced by Y. V. Rao and written by P. R. Narayanan. It stars Y. V. Rao, Kumari Rukmani, B. R. Panthulu, B. Jayamma, K. Sarangapani, K. R. Chellam and T. R. Ramachandran. The film features music by C. R. Subbu Raman.

Plot 
Kameswari has been separated from her husband, Jagannatha for twelve years, enduring poverty, agony, and blackmail.

Cast 
Credits adapted from the film's songbook

Male cast
 Y. V. Rao as Jagannatha Panditharajan
 B. R. Panthulu as Shah Jahan
 Rangaswami as Perubhattar
 K. Sarangapani as Muthanna
 T. R. Ramachandran as Gopu
 Sundar Rao as Appaiah Dikshithar
 Kasivishwanathan as Battoji

Female cast
 Kumari Rukmani as Lavangi (Kameswari)
 B. Jayamma as Mumtaz
 Bhanumathi as Mahalakshmi
 K. R. Chellam as Komalam
 Jayagowri as Manorama
Dance
The Dance Group of Miss Azurie

Supporting cast
 V. S. Mani, Natesa Iyer, Sethupathi Pillai, Rajam Iyengar, Anantharaman, Rajarathnam, Jaya and Kalyani.

Production 
The film, which was shot at the famed Newton Studios, was recorded by noted photographer Jiten Bannerjee and designed by celebrated art director and film-maker F. Nagoor.

Soundtrack 
The music for the film was composed by Subbaraman and Padmanabha Shastri, with lyrics written by Papanasam Sivan. The songs were recorded by Dinshaw K. Tehrani and Loganathan. The film had melodious songs including a popular duet Vashakaarar Pola Thonuthey (performed by Rao and Rukmini).

Release and reception 
Lavangi was released on 10 May 1946, and distributed by Chandralekha. The Indian Express positively reviewed the film for Rao's performance, but criticised some of Narayanan's dialogue for vulgarity. However, the film was not commercially successful. It was later dubbed into Hindi, which was not successful either.

References

External links 
 

1940s historical films
1940s Tamil-language films
1946 films
Indian black-and-white films
Films scored by C. R. Subbaraman
Films scored by Padmanabha Shastri
Indian historical films
Films directed by Y. V. Rao